Queens Park is an electoral ward and area in Bedford, England. The area's borders are approximately Bromham Road and Beverley Crescent to the north, the Midland Main Line railway line to the east, and the River Great Ouse to the south.

Queens Park is a diverse and multicultural area, reflected in the many specialist shops and businesses located in the community, including many international supermarkets and delis. There are also a varied number of places of worship, including an Anglican church, two mosques and the largest Sikh temple in the United Kingdom outside London.

History 

The land in Queens Park was farmed as early as the 11th century, and occupied by tenant farmers.  The only evidence of primitive settlements is the discovery of flint at Honey Hills. Early settlements and dwellings included; Provendor Farm, Prebend Farm, and the Farm House & cottages at Bedford Ford End (until the 1950s) now Fernleigh Close. Gallows existed up to 1802 at the sharp bend on the Bromham Road.

In 1890 W.H.Allen from London brought twenty acres of land west of Bedford town centre to establish his 'Queens Engineering Works', and housing for his employees. The works (opened in 1894) and the new community were named in honour of the queen of the day, Queen Victoria.

Queens Park has hosted many communities migrating to the Bedford area over the 20th century, firstly Irish and Italian families, followed by Asians, Africans, and most recently, people from Eastern Europe.

The engineering works survived in Queens Park for over 100 years, but over that time a great number of other businesses and shops have established themselves in the area. Today, Queens Park is one of the most established and centrally located areas in Bedford.

Bedford Town Football Club played in the area between 1913 - 1981, and again briefly upon re-formation in the early 1990s.

Governance
Queens Park is an unparished area, with all community services under the direct control of Bedford Borough Council. Queens Park elects two councillors to Bedford Borough Council, both councillors are currently from the Labour Party.

Economy

There are a great many shops serving the Queens Park population, which are a mix of mostly independent retailers, with a few chain stores. Ford End Road acts as the "high street" for the area, and includes independent supermarkets, deli's, takeaway restaurants, and a Tesco Express store. There are more shops and businesses located on Iddesleigh Road, including convenience stores and Queens Park's post office.

One of the largest businesses in the area is the 'Eagle Brewery' (operated by Marston's Brewery). The brewery is now the largest employer in Queens Park after the closure of the Allen's Engineering Works in 2000.

Education
There are three primary schools in Queens Park - Queens Park Academy which is situated over two sites on Chestnut Avenue and Marlborough Road, Westfield School on Chester Road, and St Joseph's and St Gregory's Roman Catholic Primary School which is also on Chester Road. For older children the area is in the catchment for Biddenham International School which is located just to the north of Queens Park.

Enterprise House (located on Old Ford End Road) is a small adult education centre operated by Bedford College. The centre offers a range of part-time courses for the Queens Park community, covering a range of subjects from child care and computing to English language skills and maths.

Religious sites
 All Saints Church (Church of England), located on Iddesleigh Road
 Bedford Moravian Church, located on Howard Avenue
 Serbian Orthodox Church services are also held at Bedford Moravian Church
 The Jamia Masjid Gulshani Baghdad Mosque, located on Westbourne Road
 The Jamia Masjid Hanfia Ghousia Mosque located on Ford End Road
 The Guru Nanak Gurdwara (Sikh Temple), also on Ford End Road

Community facilities

The area is on a main bus route into Bedford town centre. The main open space in Queens Park is located along the riverside as well as the Allen Park Recreation Ground. There is also a provision of allotments located on the western edge of the area. Queens Park Community Centre is situated on Marlborough Road.

References

External links 
 Queens Park Urban Community Council
 Queens Park Community Centre

Areas of Bedford